Helmut Lange IC was a German World War I flying ace credited with nine aerial victories.

World War I
Helmut Lange served in Jagdstaffel 26 during World War I. He scored nine aerial victories there, under the leadership of Bruno Loerzer and Franz Brandt. Lange temporarily commanded of the squadron from 22 August through 12 September 1918.

List of aerial victories
See also Aerial victory standards of World War I

Post World War I
Although Lange almost certainly survived the war, it is not known what became of him.

Endnotes

References
 Franks, Norman, Frank W. Bailey, Russell Guest (1993). Above the Lines: The Aces and Fighter Units of the German Air Service, Naval Air Service and Flanders Marine Corps, 1914-1918.  Grub Street. , .

German World War I flying aces
20th-century deaths